was a Japanese painter also known as Kanō Heishiro. He was born in Hizen Province, Kyūshū, and died in Kyoto.

Biography 
Sansetsu was apprenticed to Kanō Sanraku, married his daughter, and was adopted by him after the death of Sanraku's eldest son. Later, he became the leader of the Kanō school. He was the father of Kanō Einō.

Works
Dragon in the clouds, hanging scroll, ink on paper.
Huang Chuping, hanging scroll, ink on paper.
Laozi, one of a pair of six-panel folding screens, ink on paper.
Mount Fuji, hanging scroll, ink and gold on paper.
The old plum ca. 1645, four sliding door panels (fusuma), ink, color, gold leaf on paper.
Seabirds on a winter coast, screen, color, India ink, and gold on paper. collection hosotsugi, Kyoto.
The ten snow incidents, one of a pair of six-panel folding screens, ink and light color on paper.
Transcendent, hanging scroll, ink on paper.
Two chickens on thatched roof, hanging scroll, ink and light color on paper.
Xiwangmu (Seiobo), the Queen Mother of the West and Mu Wang (Bokuo), one of a pair of six-panel folding screens, ink on paper.

Gallery 

Folding screens

Chinese figure portraits

References

External links
Bridge of dreams: the Mary Griggs Burke collection of Japanese art, a catalog from The Metropolitan Museum of Art Libraries (fully available online as PDF), which contains material on this artist (see index)
 The Old Plum, Metropolitan Museum of Art

1589 births
1651 deaths
People from Saga Prefecture
16th-century Japanese people
17th-century Japanese people
16th-century Japanese artists
17th-century Japanese artists
16th-century Japanese painters
17th-century Japanese painters
Kanō school